The following is a list of wrestling video games based on professional wrestling, licensed by promotions such as WWF/WWE, WCW, ECW, NJPW, TNA, and AAA.

Promotion–based games

All Elite Wrestling
Video games by professional wrestling promotion All Elite Wrestling:
AEW Casino: Double or Nothing [2020] (iOS, Android)
AEW Elite GM [2020] (iOS, Android)
AEW Fight Forever [upcoming] (Nintendo Switch, PlayStation 5, PlayStation 4, Xbox Series X/S, Xbox One, PC)

All Japan Pro Wrestling
Video games by professional wrestling promotion All Japan Pro Wrestling:
All Japan Pro Wrestling [1993] (SNES)
All Japan Pro Wrestling Dash: World's Strongest Tag Team [1993] (SNES)
All Japan Pro Wrestling Jet [1994] (Game Boy)
All Japan Pro Wrestling 2: 3-4 Budokan [1995] (SNES)
All Japan Pro Wrestling featuring Virtua [1997] (Saturn)
King's Soul: All Japan Pro Wrestling [1999] (PlayStation)
Giant Gram: All Japan Pro Wrestling 2 [1999] (Dreamcast)
Giant Gram 2000: All Japan Pro Wrestling 3 [2000] (Dreamcast)
Virtual Pro Wrestling 2 [2000] (Nintendo 64)

All Japan Women's Pro-Wrestling
Video games by former professional wrestling promotion All Japan Women's Pro-Wrestling:

Dump Matsumoto (Body Slam) [1986] (Arcade)
Fire Pro Women: All-Star Dream Slam [1994] (SNES)
Super Fire Pro Wrestling: Queen's Special [1995] (Super Famicom, TurboGrafx-16/PC Engine)
Wrestling Universe: Fire Pro Women: Dome Super Female Big Battle: All Japan Women VS J.W.P. [1995] (TurboGrafx-CD/PC Engine-CD)
All Japan Women's Pro-Wrestling: Queen of Queens [1995] (PC-FX)
All Japan Women's Pro-Wrestling [1998] (PlayStation)

Extreme Championship Wrestling
Video games by former professional wrestling promotion Extreme Championship Wrestling:
ECW Hardcore Revolution [2000] (Nintendo 64, PlayStation, Game Boy Color, Dreamcast)
ECW Anarchy Rulz  [2000] (PlayStation, Dreamcast)

New Japan Pro-Wrestling
Video games by professional wrestling promotion New Japan Pro-Wrestling:
New Japan Pro-Wrestling: The Three Musketeers [1991] (Game Boy)
New Japan Pro-Wrestling: Fantastic Story in Tokyo Dome [1993] (SNES)
New Japan Pro-Wrestling '94 [1994] (SNES)
New Japan Pro-Wrestling '94: Battlefield in Tokyo Dome [1994] (TurboGrafx-CD, Super Famicom)
New Japan Pro-Wrestling '95: Battle 7 in Tokyo Dome [1995] (SNES)
New Japan Pro-Wrestling: Toukon Retsuden [1995] (PlayStation, WonderSwan)
New Japan Pro-Wrestling: Toukon Retsuden 2 [1996] (PlayStation)
New Japan Pro-Wrestling: Toukon Road – Brave Spirits [1998] (Nintendo 64)
New Japan Pro-Wrestling: Toukon Retsuden 3 [1998] (PlayStation)
New Japan Pro-Wrestling: Toukon Road 2 – The Next Generation [1998] (Nintendo 64)
New Japan Pro-Wrestling: Toukon Retsuden 4 [1999] (Dreamcast)
New Japan Pro-Wrestling: Toukon Retsuden Advance [2002] (Game Boy Advance)  
Fire Pro Wrestling World [2018] (Personal Computer/PC, PlayStation 4)
NJPW Collection [2020] (iOS, Android)
NJPW Strong Spirits [2021] (iOS, Android)

Total Nonstop Action Wrestling
Video games by professional wrestling promotion Total Nonstop Action Wrestling:
TNA Impact! [2008] (PlayStation 2, PlayStation 3, Xbox 360, Wii)
TNA Wrestling [2009] (iOS)
TNA Impact!: Cross The Line [2010] (Nintendo DS, PlayStation Portable)
TNA Wrestling Impact! [2011] (iOS, Android)

World Championship Wrestling
Video games by former professional wrestling promotion World Championship Wrestling:
WCW Wrestling [1989] (NES)
WCW: The Main Event [1994] (Game Boy)
WCW SuperBrawl Wrestling [1994] (SNES)
WCW vs. the World [1997] (PlayStation)
WCW vs. nWo: World Tour [1997] (Nintendo 64)
Virtual Pro Wrestling 64 [1997] (Nintendo 64)
WCW Nitro [1998] (PlayStation, Nintendo 64, Microsoft Windows)
WCW/nWo Revenge [1998] (Nintendo 64)
WCW/nWo Thunder [1999] (PlayStation)
WCW Mayhem [1999] (PlayStation, Nintendo 64, Game Boy Color)
WCW Backstage Assault [2000] (PlayStation, Nintendo 64)

World Wrestling Entertainment
Some WWF/WWE games which share a name but were produced for different platforms are considered separate, especially if they were released years apart.  For example, the SNES game WWF Royal Rumble is completely different from the Dreamcast game entitled WWF Royal Rumble released years later.

MicroLeague Wrestling [1987] (Amiga, Commodore 64)
WWF WrestleMania [1989] (NES)
WWF Superstars [1989] (Arcade)
WWF WrestleMania Challenge [1990] (NES, Commodore 64)
WWF Superstars [1991] (Game Boy)
WWF WrestleMania [1991] (Amstrad CPC, Amiga, Commodore 64, ZX Spectrum, Atari ST, Personal Computer/PC)
WWF WrestleFest  [1991] (Arcade)
WWF Superstars 2 [1992] (Game Boy)
WWF European Rampage Tour [1992] (Amiga, Atari ST, Personal Computer/PC, Commodore 64)
WWF Super WrestleMania [1992] (SNES, Mega Drive/Genesis)
WWF WrestleMania: Steel Cage Challenge [1992] (Master System, Game Gear, NES)
WWF Royal Rumble [1993] (SNES, Mega Drive/Genesis)
WWF Rage in the Cage [1993] (Sega CD)
WWF King of the Ring [1993] (NES, Game Boy)
WWF Raw [1994] (32X, Mega Drive/Genesis, Game Boy, Game Gear, SNES)
WWF WrestleMania: The Arcade Game  [1995] (Arcade, 32X, Mega Drive/Genesis, MS-DOS, PlayStation, Saturn, SNES)
WWF In Your House [1996] (Personal Computer/PC, PlayStation, Saturn, MS-DOS)
WWF War Zone  [1998] (Game Boy, PlayStation, Nintendo 64)
WWF Attitude [1999] (Game Boy Color, Nintendo 64, PlayStation, Dreamcast)
WWF WrestleMania 2000 [1999] (Nintendo 64, Game Boy Color)
WWF SmackDown! [2000] (PlayStation)
WWF Royal Rumble [2000] (Arcade, Dreamcast)
WWF SmackDown! 2: Know Your Role [2000] (PlayStation)
WWF No Mercy [2000] (Nintendo 64)
With Authority! [2001] (Personal Computer/PC)
WWF Betrayal [2001] (Game Boy Color)
WWF Road to WrestleMania [2001] (Game Boy Advance)
WWF SmackDown! Just Bring It [2001] (PlayStation 2)
WWF Raw [2002] (Personal Computer/PC, Xbox)
WWE WrestleMania X8 [2002] (Gamecube)
WWE Road to WrestleMania X8 [2002] (Game Boy Advance)
WWE SmackDown! Shut Your Mouth [2002] (PlayStation 2)
WWE Crush Hour [2003] (PlayStation 2, Gamecube)
WWE Raw 2 [2003] (Xbox)
WWE WrestleMania XIX [2003] (Gamecube)
WWE SmackDown! Here Comes the Pain [2003] (PlayStation 2)
WWE Mobile Madness [2003] (Mobile)
WWE Mobile Madness Hardcore [2003] (Mobile)
WWE Mobile Madness: Cage [2003] (Mobile)
WWE Day of Reckoning [2004] (Gamecube)
WWE Survivor Series [2004] (Game Boy Advance)
WWE SmackDown! vs. Raw [2004] (PlayStation 2)
WWE Raw [2005] (Mobile)
WWE Smackdown [2005] (Mobile)
WWE WrestleMania 21 [2005] (Xbox)
WWE Aftershock [2005] (N-Gage)
WWE Day of Reckoning 2 [2005] (Gamecube)
WWE SmackDown! vs. Raw 2006 [2005] (PlayStation 2, PlayStation Portable)
WWE SmackDown vs. Raw 2007 [2006] (Xbox 360, PlayStation 2, PlayStation Portable)
WWE SmackDown vs. Raw 2008 [2007] (PlayStation 2, PlayStation 3, PlayStation Portable, Nintendo DS, Wii, Xbox 360, Mobile)
WWE SmackDown vs. Raw 2009 [2008] (PlayStation 2, PlayStation 3, PlayStation Portable, Nintendo DS, Wii, Xbox 360, Mobile)
WWE Legends of WrestleMania [2009] (PlayStation 3, Xbox 360, IOS)
WWE SmackDown vs. Raw 2010 [2009] (PlayStation 2, PlayStation 3, PlayStation Portable, Nintendo DS, Wii, Xbox 360, IOS)
WWE SmackDown vs. Raw 2011 [2010] (PlayStation 2, PlayStation 3, PlayStation Portable, Wii, Xbox 360)
WWE All Stars [2011] (PlayStation 2, PlayStation 3, PlayStation Portable, Wii, Nintendo 3DS, Xbox 360)
 WWE Superstar Slingshot [2011] (Mobile)
WWE '12 [2011] (PlayStation 3, Wii, Xbox 360)
WWE '13 [2012] (PlayStation 3, Wii, Xbox 360)
Apptivity WWE Rumblers [2012] (iPad)
WWE WrestleFest [2012] (iPad)
WWE 2K14 [2013] (PlayStation 3, Xbox 360)
WWE Presents: John Cena's Fast Lane [2013] (iOS, Android)
WWE Presents: RockPocalypse [2013] (iOS, Android)
WWE SuperCard [2014] (iOS, Android)
WWE 2K15 [2014] (PlayStation 3, Xbox 360, PlayStation 4, Xbox One, Personal Computer/PC, Android, iOS)
WWE 2K [2015] (iOS, Android)
WWE Immortals [2015] (iOS, Android)
WWE 2K16 [2015] (PlayStation 3, Xbox 360, PlayStation 4, Xbox One, Personal Computer/PC)
WWE 2K17 [2016] (PlayStation 3, Xbox 360, PlayStation 4, Xbox One, Personal Computer/PC)
WWE Champions [2017] (iOS, Android)
 WWE Tap Mania [2017] (iOS, Android)
WWE 2K18 [2017] (PlayStation 4, Xbox One, Nintendo Switch, Personal Computer/PC)
WWE Mayhem [2017] (iOS, Android)
WWE 2K19 [2018] (PlayStation 4, Xbox One, Personal Computer/PC)
WWE 2K20 [2019] (PlayStation 4, Xbox One, Personal Computer/PC)
WWE Universe [2019] (iOS, Android) 
The King of Fighters All Star [2020] (iOS, Android)
WWE 2K Battlegrounds [2020] (PlayStation 4, Xbox One, Nintendo Switch, Personal Computer/PC)
WWE Champions 2021 [2021] (iOS, Android)
WWE Undefeated [2021] (iOS, Android)
WWE 2K22 [2022] (PlayStation 4, Xbox One, PlayStation 5, Xbox Series X, Personal Computer/PC)

Other promotions
Frontier Martial-Arts Wrestling — Onita Atsushi FMW [1993] (Super Famicom)
JWP Project — JWP Women's Pro-Wrestling: Pure Wrestle Queens [1994] (Super Famicom)
Wrestle and Romance — Genichiro Tenryu's Pro-Wrestling Revolution [1994] (Super Famicom) Released in North America as Hammerlock Wrestling.
Lucha Libre AAA World Wide — Lucha Libre AAA: Héroes del Ring [2010] (PlayStation 3, Xbox 360)
5 Star Wrestling — 5 Star Wrestling [2015] (PlayStation 3, PlayStation 4)
Chikara — Action Arcade Wrestling [2021] (Personal Computer/PC, PlayStation 4, Xbox One) The Chikara name was dropped from branding due to the company's controversy and closure.
World Wonder Ring Stardom — Fire Pro Wrestling World [2018] (Personal Computer/PC, PlayStation 4)

Brandless games
These titles do not belong to a specific brand.  However, some of the following titles include real wrestlers from brands like WWF/WWE, WCW, NWA, ECW, TNA, NJPW, AJPW, and NOAH.
Tag Team Wrestling [1983] (Arcade)
Mat Mania – The Prowrestling Network [1985] (Arcade)
Fire Pro Wrestling Combination Tag [1989] (PC Engine, Wii)
Cutie Suzuki's Ringside Angel [1990] (Mega Drive/Genesis)
Fire Pro Wrestling 2nd Bout [1991] (PC Engine, Wii)
Super Fire Pro Wrestling [1991] (Super Famicom)
Thunder Pro Wrestling Retsuden [1992] (Mega Drive)
Fire Pro Wrestling 3: Legend Bout [1992] (PC Engine)
Super Fire Pro Wrestling 2 [1992] (Super Famicom)
Super Fire Pro Wrestling 3 Final Bout [1993] (Super Famicom)
Super Fire Pro Wrestling Special [1994] (Super Famicom)
Fire Pro Gaiden: Blazing Tornado [1994] (Arcade, Saturn)
Super Fire Pro Wrestling X [1995] (Super Famicom)
Fire Pro Wrestling: Iron Slam '96 [1996] (PlayStation)
Super Fire Pro Wrestling X Premium [1996] (Super Famicom)
Fire Prowrestling S: 6Men Scramble [1996] (Saturn)
Fire Pro Wrestling G [1999] (Playstation)
All Star Pro-Wrestling [2000] (PlayStation 2)
Simple 1500 Series Vol. 22: The Pro Wrestling [1999] (Plasystation)
Fire Pro Wrestling for WonderSwan [2000] (WonderSwan)
Simple 1500 Series Vol. 52: The Pro Wrestling 2 [2000] (Playstation)
Fire Pro Wrestling D [2001] (Dreamcast)
Fire Pro Wrestling [2001] (Game Boy Advance)
All Star Pro-Wrestling II [2001] (PlayStation 2)
Legends of Wrestling [2001] (PlayStation 2, GameCube, Xbox)
Fire Pro Wrestling 2 [2002] (Game Boy Advance)
Legends of Wrestling II [2002] (Game Boy Advance, PlayStation 2, GameCube, Xbox)
Backyard Wrestling: Don't Try This at Home [2003] (PlayStation 2, Xbox)
All Star Pro Wrestling III [2003] (PlayStation 2)
King of Colosseum [2003] (PlayStation 2)
Fire Pro Wrestling Z [2004] (PlayStation 2)
Backyard Wrestling 2: There Goes the Neighborhood [2004] (PlayStation 2, Xbox)
King of Colosseum II [2004] (PlayStation 2)
Showdown: Legends of Wrestling [2004] (PlayStation 2, Xbox)#Fire Pro Wrestling Returns [2005] (PlayStation 2)
Wrestle Kingdom [2006] (Xbox 360, PlayStation 2)
Wrestle Kingdom 2 [2007] (PlayStation 2)
Hulk Hogan's Main Event [2011] (Xbox 360)
Wrestling Revolution [2012] (Android)
Fire Pro Wrestling [2012] (Xbox 360)
Fire Pro Wrestling in Mobage [2012] (Mobage)
Wrestling Revolution 3D [2017] (Android, IOS, PC)
Wrestling Empire [2021] (Nintendo Switch, IOS,PC,Android)
RetroMania Wrestling [2021] (PlayStation 4, Xbox One, Personal Computer/PC, Nintendo Switch)
The Wrestling Code [upcoming] (PlayStation 5, Xbox Series X/S, Personal Computer/PC)
Ultra Pro Wrestling [upcoming] (PlayStation 5, Xbox Series X/S, Nintendo Switch, Personal Computer/PC)

See also
WWE 2K
List of video games in the WWE 2K Games series
List of fighting games
List of sumo video games

References

 
Video games, licensed
Wrestling video games